Nordic combined at the 2022 European Youth Olympic Winter Festival was held from 22 to 25 March at Lahti Sports Center  in Lahti, Finland.

Competition schedule

Medal summary

Medal table

Events

References 

2022
European Youth Olympic Winter Festival
2022 European Youth Olympic Winter Festival events